Mokra Prawa  is a village in the administrative district of Gmina Skierniewice, within Skierniewice County, Łódź Voivodeship, in central Poland.

The village has a population of 950.

References

Mokra Prawa